Jorge Fernandez is an Ecuadorian-Canadian tennis coach and former association football player and coach. He is the father and coach of professional tennis player Leylah Fernandez who was a finalist in the 2021 US Open Women's Singles finals against Emma Raducanu.

Early and family life 
Fernandez was born in Guayaquil, Ecuador. When he was four years old, his family relocated to Montreal, Canada, and he became a Canadian citizen when he was 14. His wife Irene Exevea is a Canadian of Filipino descent.

Career 
Fernandez was a semi-professional footballer and played football in local leagues in Montreal. He is the father and coach of professional tennis player Leylah Fernandez and her younger sister Bianca Jolie. He started coaching his daughter despite never having played tennis himself, however he draws his coaching skills from his soccer career.

References

Living people
Ecuadorian footballers
Ecuadorian expatriate footballers
Expatriate soccer players in Canada
Canadian people of Peruvian descent
Canadian people of Ecuadorian descent
Sportspeople of Ecuadorian descent
Canadian soccer players
Canadian tennis coaches
Year of birth missing (living people)
Association footballers not categorized by position